Wyanga, New South Wales is a bounded rural locality in Central, New South Wales. Wyanga is a station on the Parkes–Narromine railway line.
 
The economy of Wyanga is mainly based on broad acre agriculture including sheep, cattle and wheat.

References

Towns in New South Wales
Localities in New South Wales
Regional railway stations in New South Wales
Populated places in New South Wales
Geography of New South Wales